() is a Japanese bank, listed on the Tokyo Stock Exchange and Nagoya Stock Exchange. It is descended from a company founded in 1910.

See also
List of banks
List of banks in Japan

References

External links 
 Company website 
 Annual reports
  Wiki collection of bibliographic works on Aichi Bank

Banks established in 1910
Regional banks of Japan
Companies listed on the Tokyo Stock Exchange
Companies based in Nagoya
Companies listed on the Nagoya Stock Exchange
Japanese companies established in 1910